Vincent Van Peteghem (28 October 1980) is a Belgian economist and politician of CD&V who has been serving as Minister of Finance in the government of Prime Minister Alexander De Croo since 1 October 2020. He was a member of the Chamber of Representatives of Belgium from 2014 until 2020.

Early life and career
Vincent Van Peteghem was born on 28 October 1980 in Ghent. He was a management professor at the EDHEC Business School in Lille, France.

Political career
In the 2014 elections, Peteghem was first elected to the Chamber of Representatives for CD&V, and served until 2019. He became mayor of De Pinte on 1 January 2019. In 2019, he was a candidate as Chairman of the CD&V, but finished in fourth place.

On 1 October 2020, Peteghem became Deputy Prime Minister and Minister of Finance in the cabinet of Alexander De Croo.

Other activities

European Union organizations
 European Investment Bank (EIB), Ex-Officio Member of the Board of Governors (since 2019)
 European Stability Mechanism (ESM), Ex-Officio Member of the Board of Governors (since 2020)

International organizations
 African Development Bank (AfDB), Ex-Officio Alternate Member of the Board of Governors (since 2020)
 Asian Development Bank (ADB), Ex-Officio Member of the Board of Governors (since 2020)
 Asian Infrastructure Investment Bank (AIIB), Ex-Officio Member of the Board of Governors (since 2020)
 European Bank for Reconstruction and Development (EBRD), Ex-Officio Member of the Board of Governors (since 2020)
 Inter-American Development Bank (IADB), Ex-Officio Member of the Board of Governors (since 2020)
 International Monetary Fund (IMF), Ex-Officio Alternate Member of the Board of Governors (since 2020)
 World Bank, Ex-Officio Member of the Board of Governors (since 2020)

References

External links 

  

21st-century Belgian politicians
Finance ministers of Belgium
Living people
Politicians from Ghent
1980 births
Mayors of places in Belgium